Edward Dalton  (April 1882 – unknown) was an English footballer who played as a full-back. Born in Chorlton-cum-Hardy, Manchester, he began his career with Pendlebury, before joining Manchester United as an amateur in September 1905. He turned professional in January 1906, but it was not until 25 March 1908 that he made his Manchester United debut, starting at left-back in a 7–4 defeat away to Liverpool. In August that year, he returned to Pendlebury for their second season in the second division of the Lancashire Combination, but left for St Helens Recreation a year later after Pendlebury resigned from the league.

External links
Profile at StretfordEnd.co.uk
Profile at MUFCinfo.com

1882 births
English footballers
Pendlebury F.C. players
Manchester United F.C. players
St Helens Recreation F.C. players
People from Chorlton-cum-Hardy
Year of death missing
Footballers from Manchester
Association football defenders